The Nguburinji people, also written Ngoborindi, Oborindi and other variations, are an Aboriginal Australian people whose traditional lands lie in northwest Queensland.

Country
According to Norman Tindale, the Nguburinji lands extended over  taking in the southern headwaters of the Gregory River. They were also present at what is the World Heritage fossil site of Riversleigh, Gregory Downs, and Mount Margaret. Their northern boundaries reached up to Lawn Hill Creek and Punjaub.

Their land lay to the south of the Yukulta / Ganggalidda, west of the Mingin people, east of the Waanyi, and north of the Injilarija (whose lands the Waanyi occupied around 1880, when the Injilarija became extinct ).

Social system
According to Lauriston Sharp, the Nguburinji social organisation belonged to the Laierdila typology of the Australian system of kinship characterised by the Mara type of semi-moieties with a segmentary lineage, and had eight sub-sections organised as unnamed patrilineal semi-moieties and moieties.

History of contact
Over time, after the advent of European colonisation, the Nguburinji shifted to the Wakabunga country around Morstone Downs.

Language

Nguburinji (Ngubirindi) is regarded as a dialect of the Yukulta (Ganggalida) language. It is in the Tangkic language group.

Alternative names
 Ngoborundji, Ngoboringi
 Oborindi, Oboroondi, Obor-indi

Source :

Notes

Citations

Sources

Aboriginal peoples of Queensland